Jere Rouhiainen (born January 26, 1996) is a Finnish professional ice hockey player. He is currently playing for Brûleurs de Loups  of the French Synerglace Ligue Magnus.

Rouhiainen made his Liiga debut playing with LeKi during the 2015-16 Liiga season.

References

External links

1996 births
Living people
Tappara players
Lempäälän Kisa players
Finnish ice hockey defencemen
Ice hockey people from Tampere
Ice hockey players at the 2012 Winter Youth Olympics
Youth Olympic gold medalists for Finland